Taqiabad (also Romanized as Taqīābād) is a village in Miyan Rud Rural District, Qolqol Rud District, Tuyserkan County, Hamadan Province, Iran. At the 2006 census, its population was 242, in 51 families.

References 

Populated places in Tuyserkan County